Passô is a Portuguese hamlet located in the parish of Terroso, Póvoa de Varzim.

Villages in Portugal